Prinsuéjols-Malbouzon is a commune in the department of Lozère, southern France. The municipality was established on 1 January 2017 by merger of the former communes of Malbouzon (the seat) and Prinsuéjols.

See also 
Communes of the Lozère department

References 

Communes of Lozère